Starshield may refer to:

 Starshield (fiction), a proposed trilogy of science fiction novels
 Starshield (satellite constellation), a SpaceX satellite model for incorporating military or civil-government payloads